The rivers of Galicia form part of a dense hydrographical network in the Spanish autonomous community of Galicia and has been described by Otero Pedrayo as “the land of a thousand rivers”. Most rivers are not deep enough to be navigable, although small boats are sailed in the lower courses of the River Minho and several others, as well as at many of the dams.

The rivers flowing into the Bay of Biscay (Cantabrian Sea) tend to be very short, and those flowing into the Atlantic Ocean are only a little longer, except for the Minho (340 km) and the Sil (225 km), whose lengths are several hundred kilometres.  There are numerous rapids, due to the steep gradients of many river courses.

In addition to river fishing, rivers have been used to power mills, and dams have been constructed both to provide hydroelectric power and for storage of water.

Alphabetical list of Galician rivers

A

B

C

D

E

F

G

H

I

L

M

N

O

P

Q

R

S

T

U

V

X

See also
Galicia, Spain#Hydrography
Gallery (1)
Gallery (2)
Maps of river basins of Galicia

References

Further reading
Otero Pedrayo, R. Os ríos galegos. Ed. Castrelos. Vigo, 1977. .

 
Lists of rivers